= Lusigeti =

Lusigetti
- Location within Kenya
- Coordinates: 1.27°S 36.6°E
- Country: Kenya
- County: Kikuyu Constituency Kiambu
- Time zone: UTC+3 (EAT)

Lusigetti is a settlement in Kenya's Kikuyu Constituency Kiambu County.
